The state funeral of Elizabeth II, Queen of the United Kingdom and the 14 other Commonwealth realms, was attended by a significant number of dignitaries from across the world, with priority given to those from the Commonwealth of Nations. They attended a service at Westminster Abbey on 19 September 2022. In addition to foreign dignitaries, a small number of the Queen's family, friends, cabinet ministers, religious representatives, courtiers and employees, and volunteers who have supported their communities attended.
To accommodate all countries wishing to be allocated seats, the UK government limited the number of members in each official diplomatic delegation to two. 500 heads of state and foreign dignitaries were present at the funeral ceremony, which was attended by 2,000 people in total.

Representatives from 168 countries, out of 193 UN member states, two UN observer states and Kosovo (whose declaration of independence is recognised by the United Kingdom), confirmed attendance, including 18 monarchs, 55 presidents and 25 prime ministers.

Royal family
 Present at the committal service at St George's Chapel, Windsor Castle only.

The late Queen's descendants and their relationship to her:
 The King and The Queen Consort, son and daughter-in-law
 The Prince and Princess of Wales, grandson and granddaughter-in-law
 Prince George of Wales, great-grandson
 Princess Charlotte of Wales, great-granddaughter
 The Duke and Duchess of Sussex, grandson and granddaughter-in-law
 The Princess Royal and Vice Admiral Sir Timothy Laurence, daughter and son-in-law
 Peter Phillips, grandson
 Savannah Phillips, great-granddaughter*
 Isla Phillips, great-granddaughter*
 Zara and Michael Tindall, granddaughter and grandson-in-law
 Mia Tindall, great-granddaughter* 
 The Duke of York and Sarah, Duchess of York, son and former daughter-in-law
 Princess Beatrice and Edoardo Mapelli Mozzi, granddaughter and grandson-in-law
 Princess Eugenie and Jack Brooksbank, granddaughter and grandson-in-law
 The Earl and Countess of Wessex and Forfar, son and daughter-in-law
 Lady Louise Mountbatten-Windsor, granddaughter
 Viscount Severn, grandson
Other descendants of King George VI and their relationship to the late Queen:
 The Earl of Snowdon, nephew
 Viscount Linley, great-nephew
 Lady Margarita Armstrong-Jones, great-niece
 Lady Sarah and Daniel Chatto, niece and nephew-in-law
 Samuel Chatto, great-nephew
 2Lt Arthur Chatto, great-nephew
Other descendants of King George V and their relationship to the late Queen:
 The Duke and Duchess of Gloucester, first cousin and his wife
 Earl and Countess of Ulster, first cousin once removed and his wife
 Lord Culloden, first cousin twice removed
 Lady Cosima Windsor, first cousin twice removed
 Lady Davina Windsor, first cousin once removed
 Senna Lewis, first cousin twice removed
 Lady Rose and George Gilman, first cousin once removed and her husband
 Lyla Gilman, first cousin twice removed
 The Duke of Kent, first cousin
 Earl and Countess of St Andrews, first cousin once removed and his wife
 Lord Downpatrick, first cousin twice removed
 Lady Marina Windsor, first cousin twice removed
 Lady Amelia Windsor, first cousin twice removed
 Lady Helen and Timothy Taylor, first cousin once removed and her husband
 Columbus Taylor, first cousin twice removed
 Cassius Taylor, first cousin twice removed
 Eloise Taylor, first cousin twice removed
 Estella Taylor, first cousin twice removed
 Lord Nicholas Windsor, first cousin once removed
 Albert Windsor, first cousin twice removed
 Leopold Windsor, first cousin twice removed
 Princess Alexandra, The Hon. Lady Ogilvy, first cousin
 James and Julia Ogilvy, first cousin once removed and his wife
 Flora and Timothy Vesterberg, first cousin twice removed and her husband
 Alexander Ogilvy, first cousin twice removed
 Marina Ogilvy, first cousin once removed
 Zenouska Mowatt, first cousin twice removed
 Christian Mowatt, first cousin twice removed
 Prince and Princess Michael of Kent, first cousin and his wife
 Lord and Lady Frederick Windsor, first cousin once removed and his wife
 Lady Gabriella and Thomas Kingston, first cousin once removed and her husband
 The Earl and Countess of Harewood, first cousin once removed and his wife*
Other descendants of King Edward VII and their relationship to the late Queen:
 The Duke and Duchess of Fife, second cousin once removed and his wife
 Lady Alexandra and Mark Etherington, second cousin once removed and her husband
Other descendants of Queen Victoria and their relationship to the late Queen:
 The Duchess and Duke of Wellington, third cousin once removed and her husband*
 The Countess Mountbatten of Burma, wife of third cousin once removed
 Lady Alexandra and Thomas Hooper, third cousin twice removed and her husband
 The Hon. Michael-John Knatchbull, third cousin once removed*
 Lady Joanna Zuckerman, third cousin once removed*
 Lady Amanda Ellingworth, third cousin once removed*
 The Hon. Philip Knatchbull, third cousin once removed* 
 The Hon. Timothy Knatchbull, third cousin once removed*
 Lady Pamela Hicks, third cousin
 Edwina Brudenell, third cousin once removed*
 Maddison Modupe-Ojo, third cousin twice removed*
 India Flint Wood, third cousin once removed
Ian Liddell-Grainger, third cousin once removed, representing the Commonwealth Parliamentary Association

Bowes-Lyon family
Descendants of the late Queen's aunt, Mary Elphinstone, Lady Elphinstone:
 Rosemary and James Leschallas, first cousin once removed and her husband
 Susan and Peregrine Bertie, first cousin once removed and her husband
 Simon and Susan Rhodes, first cousin once removed and his wife
 Michael Rhodes, first cousin once removed
 Annabel Cope, first cousin once removed
 Victoria and John Pryor, first cousin once removed and her husband
Descendants of the late Queen's uncle, Lt. The Hon. John Bowes-Lyon:
 Leonora, Countess of Lichfield, former wife of first cousin once removed*
Descendants of the late Queen's aunt, Rose Leveson-Gower, Countess Granville:
 The Earl Granville, first cousin once removed*
 The Hon. Niall Leveson-Gower, first cousin once removed*
 Gilbert and Rosalind Clayton, first cousin once removed and his wife
 Rose and William Stancer, first cousin once removed and her husband
Descendants of the late Queen's uncle, Lt.-Col. The Hon. Michael Bowes-Lyon:
 Lady Elizabeth and Antony Leeming, first cousin once removed, and her husband
 Lady Diana and Christopher Godfrey-Faussett, first cousin once removed and her husband
 Sarah and Peter Troughton, first cousin once removed and her husband
 Sabrina and Christopher Penn, first cousin once removed and her husband*
 Matthew and Jane Colman, first cousin once removed and his wife
 The Hon. Albemarle Bowes-Lyon, first cousin
Descendants of the late Queen's uncle, The Hon. Sir David Bowes-Lyon:
 Sir Simon Bowes-Lyon and Caroline, Lady Bowes-Lyon, first cousin and his wife
Descendants of the late Queen's great-uncle, The Hon. Francis Bowes-Lyon:
 Capt. David and Harriet Bowes-Lyon, second cousin once removed and his wife

Spencer family
 The Earl and Countess Spencer*, former brother-in-law of the King and godson of the late Queen, and his wife
 The Lady and Lord Fellowes, former sister-in-law of the King, and her husband, a former private secretary to the late Queen

Parker Bowles and Shand families
 Andrew Parker Bowles, former husband of the Queen Consort*
 Tom Parker Bowles, godson of the King and son of the Queen Consort
 Lola Parker Bowles, granddaughter of the Queen Consort
 Frederick Parker Bowles, grandson of the Queen Consort
 Laura and Harry Lopes, daughter and son-in-law of the Queen Consort
 Eliza Lopes, granddaughter of the Queen Consort
 Gus Lopes, grandson of the Queen Consort
 Louis Lopes, grandson of the Queen Consort
 Annabel and Simon Elliot, sister and brother-in-law of the Queen Consort

Middleton family
 Michael and Carole Middleton, parents of the Princess of Wales

Phillips family
 Mark Phillips, former husband of the Princess Royal*

Other royalty
 Present at the committal service at St George's Chapel, Windsor Castle only.

** Present at both the committal service and state funeral

Members of reigning royal houses
 The Crown Prince of Bahrain (representing the King of Bahrain)
 The King and Queen of the Belgians**
 The King and Queen of Bhutan
 The Sultan of Brunei
 Prince Abdul Mateen of Brunei
 The Queen of Denmark**
 The Crown Prince of Denmark
 The Emperor and Empress of Japan
 The King and Queen of Jordan
 Princess Haya bint Hussein of Jordan*
 Prince Hassan bin Talal and Princess Sarvath al-Hassan of Jordan*
 The Crown Prince of Kuwait (representing the Emir of Kuwait)
 The King of Lesotho
 The Hereditary Prince and Hereditary Princess of Liechtenstein (representing the Prince of Liechtenstein)
 The Grand Duke and Grand Duchess of Luxembourg
 The Yang di-Pertuan Agong and Raja Permaisuri Agong of Malaysia
 The Prince and Princess of Monaco
 Prince Moulay Rachid of Morocco (representing the King of Morocco)
 The King and Queen of the Netherlands**
 Princess Beatrix of the Netherlands**
 The King and Queen of Norway**
 The Sultan of Oman
 The Emir and Sheikha Jawaher bint Hamad of Qatar
 Sheikha Amna bint Mohammed of Qatar*
 Sheikh Hamad bin Abdullah of Qatar*
 Prince Faisal bin Turki of Saudi Arabia (representing the King of Saudi Arabia)
 The King** and Queen of Spain
 King Juan Carlos I and Queen Sofía of Spain**
 The King and Queen of Sweden**
 The King of Tonga
 Titilupe Fanetupouvava'u Tuita-Tupou Tu'ivakano, Tongan High Commissioner to the United Kingdom
 The Emir of Dubai (representing the President of the United Arab Emirates)

Members of non-reigning royal houses

 The Margravine of Baden
 The Hereditary Prince and Hereditary Princess of Baden
 Tsar Simeon II of Bulgaria
 Queen Anne-Marie of Greece
 Crown Prince Pavlos and Crown Princess Marie-Chantal of Greece
 Princess Theodora of Greece and Denmark*
 The Landgrave and Landgravine of Hesse
 The Prince and Princess of Hohenlohe-Langenburg
 Princess Xenia of Hohenlohe-Langenburg
 The Custodian of the Crown of Romania and Prince Radu of Romania
 Crown Prince Alexander and Crown Princess Katherine of Yugoslavia
 The King and Queen of the Kīngitanga

United Kingdom

*Current and former Prime Ministers were present at both the state funeral and the committal service 
 Liz Truss, Prime Minister of the United Kingdom, and Hugh O'Leary
 Sir John Major, former Prime Minister of the United Kingdom (1990–1997), and Dame Norma, Lady Major
 Sir Tony Blair, former Prime Minister of the United Kingdom (1997–2007), and Cherie, Lady Blair
 Gordon Brown, former Prime Minister of the United Kingdom (2007–2010), and Sarah Brown
 David Cameron, former Prime Minister of the United Kingdom (2010–2016), and Samantha Cameron
 Theresa, Lady May, former Prime Minister of the United Kingdom (2016–2019), and Sir Philip May
 Boris Johnson, former Prime Minister of the United Kingdom (2019–2022), and Carrie Johnson
  Sir Lindsay Hoyle, Speaker of the House of Commons, and Catherine, Lady Hoyle
  The Lord McFall of Alcluith, Lord Speaker, and The Lady McFall of Alcluith

Great Officers of State

 The Duke of Norfolk, Earl Marshal
 The Lord and Lady Carrington, Lord Great Chamberlain and his wife
 The Marquess and Marchioness of Cholmondeley, former Lord Great Chamberlain and his wife

Sovereign's Bodyguard
 The Baroness Williams of Trafford, Captain of the Honourable Corps of Gentlemen at Arms
 The Earl of Courtown, Captain of the Yeomen of the Guard
 The Duke of Buccleuch and Queensberry, Captain General of the Royal Company of Archers

Royal Household
 The Lord Parker of Minsmere, Lord Chamberlain
 The Earl of Dalhousie, Lord Steward
 The Lord de Mauley, Master of the Horse
 Tim Knox, Director of the Royal Collection
 Michael Vernon, Comptroller, Lord Chamberlain's Office
 Sir Tony Johnstone-Burt, Master of the Household
 Major General Eldon Millar, Defence Services Secretary
 Colonel Toby Browne, Crown Equerry
 Craig Whittaker, Treasurer of the Household
 Rebecca Harris, Comptroller of the Household
 Jo Churchill, Vice-Chamberlain of the Household
 Sir Edward Young, Private Secretary to the Sovereign
 Sir Clive Alderton, Principal Private Secretary to the former Prince of Wales
 Mark Leishman, Private Secretary to the former Prince of Wales
 John Sorabji, Deputy Private Secretary to the Sovereign
 David Hogan-Hern, Deputy Private Secretary to the Sovereign
 Sir Michael Stevens, Keeper of the Privy Purse
 The Earl of Rosslyn, Master of the Household to the former Prince of Wales
 The Earl and Countess of Airlie, former Lord Chamberlain and his wife, who was a Lady in Waiting to the late Queen
 The Lord Luce, former Lord Chamberlain
 The Earl and Countess Peel, former Lord Chamberlain and his wife
 The Lord and Lady Janvrin, former Private Secretary and his wife 
 The Lord and Lady Geidt, former Private Secretary and his wife
 Paul Whybrew, Page to the late Queen
 Barry Mitford, Page to the late Queen
 The Hon. Mary Morrison, Lady in Waiting to the late Queen
 The Lady Hussey of North Bradley, Lady in Waiting to the late Queen
 The Lady and Lord Elton, Lady in Waiting to the late Queen, and her husband
 The Hon. Dame Annabel Whitehead, Lady in Waiting to the late Queen
 Jennifer Gordon-Lennox, Lady in Waiting to the late Queen
 Angela Kelly, personal assistant and senior dresser to the late Queen
 The Viscount and Viscountess Brookeborough, Personal Lord in Waiting and his wife
 The Viscount Hood, Personal Lord in Waiting
 Jonathan Thompson, Equerry to the former Prince of Wales
 Rob Dixon, Equerry to the Prince of Wales

Household Division
 Lieutenant General Sir Edward Smyth-Osbourne, Gold Stick-in-Waiting
 Lieutenant General Sir James Bucknall, Colonel of the Coldstream Guards
 Major General Chris Ghika, Major-General commanding the Household Division
 Colonel Mark Berry, Silver Stick-in-Waiting
 Lieutenant Colonel Gareth Light, Field Officer in Brigade Waiting

Kings of Arms
 David White, Garter Principal King of Arms
 Joseph Morrow, Lord Lyon King of Arms
 Robert Noel, Norroy and Ulster King of Arms
 Timothy Duke, Clarenceux King of Arms
 Sarah Clarke, Lady Usher of the Black Rod

Members of the Cabinet

 Thérèse Coffey, Deputy Prime Minister, Secretary of State for Health and Social Care
 Kwasi Kwarteng, Chancellor of the Exchequer
 James Cleverly, Secretary of State for Foreign, Commonwealth and Development Affairs
 Suella Braverman, Secretary of State for the Home Department
 Ben Wallace, Secretary of State for Defence
 Brandon Lewis, Lord High Chancellor of Great Britain, Secretary of State for Justice
 Nadhim Zahawi, Chancellor of the Duchy of Lancaster, Minister for Intergovernmental Relations, Minister for Equalities
 Penny Mordaunt, Leader of the House of Commons, Lord President of the Council
 The Lord True, Leader of the House of Lords, Lord Keeper of the Privy Seal
 Jake Berry, Chairman of the Conservative Party
 Alok Sharma, President for COP26, Minister of State at the Cabinet Office
 Jacob Rees-Mogg, Secretary of State for Business, Energy and Industrial Strategy
 Kemi Badenoch, Secretary of State for International Trade
 Chloe Smith, Secretary of State for Work and Pensions
 Kit Malthouse, Secretary of State for Education
 Ranil Jayawardena, Secretary of State for Environment, Food and Rural Affairs
 Anne-Marie Trevelyan, Secretary of State for Transport
 Chris Heaton-Harris, Secretary of State for Northern Ireland
 Michelle Donelan, Secretary of State for Digital, Culture, Media and Sport
 Alister Jack, Secretary of State for Scotland
 Robert Buckland, Secretary of State for Wales

Leaders of other UK political parties
 Sir Keir Starmer, Leader of His Majesty's Most Loyal Opposition, and Leader of the Labour Party, and Victoria, Lady Starmer
 Sir Ed Davey, Leader of the Liberal Democrats, and Emily, Lady Davey
 Ian Blackford, Leader of the Scottish National Party in Westminster
 Sir Jeffrey Donaldson, Leader of the Democratic Unionist Party
 Liz Saville Roberts, Leader of Plaid Cymru in Westminster
 Naomi Long, Leader of the Alliance Party of Northern Ireland
 Colum Eastwood, Leader of the Social Democratic and Labour Party
 Doug Beattie, Leader of Ulster Unionist Party

First ministers of devolved governments
 Nicola Sturgeon, First Minister of Scotland, and Peter Murrell
 Mark Drakeford, First Minister of Wales, and Clare Drakeford
 Michelle O'Neill, First Minister-designate of Northern Ireland

Leaders of other political parties in devolved nations
Anas Sarwar, Leader of the Scottish Labour Party
Douglas Ross, Leader of the Scottish Conservative and Unionist Party
 Alex Cole-Hamilton, Leader of the Scottish Liberal Democrats, and Gillian Cole-Hamilton
 Andrew R. T. Davies, Leader of the Welsh Conservatives
 Jane Dodds, Leader of the Welsh Liberal Democrats

Other politicians
 Hamza Taouzzale, Lord Mayor of Westminster, and his mother Soud
Vincent Keaveny, Lord Mayor of London, and Amanda Keaveny
Sadiq Khan, Mayor of London, and Saadiya Khan

Recipients of orders and decorations
 Johnson Beharry, Victoria Cross recipient
 Joshua Leakey, Victoria Cross recipient
 Jim Beaton, George Cross recipient
 Matthew Croucher, George Cross recipient
 Christopher Finney, George Cross recipient
 Tony Gledhill, George Cross recipient
 Kevin Haberfield, George Cross recipient
 Kim Hughes, George Cross recipient
 Peter Norton, George Cross recipient
 Samuel Shephard, George Cross recipient
 Dominic Troulan, George Cross recipient
 The Baroness Manningham-Buller, Lady of the Garter
 The Marquess of Salisbury, Knight of the Garter
 The Baroness Amos, Lady of the Garter
 The Lord Wilson of Tillyorn, Knight of the Thistle
 The Lord Patel, Knight of the Thistle
 Lady Elish Angiolini, Lady of the Thistle
 Sir Stephen Dalton, Knight Grand Cross of the Order of the Bath
 Sir Patrick Vallance, Knight Commander of the Order of the Bath
 Susan Ridge, Companion of the Order of the Bath
 Neil MacGregor, recipient of the Order of Merit
 The Lord Darzi of Denham, recipient of the Order of Merit
 Dame Ann Dowling, recipient of the Order of Merit
 Sir David Manning, Knight Grand Cross of the Order of St. Michael and St. George
 The Baroness Ashton of Upholland, Dame Grand Cross of the Order of St. Michael and St. George
 The Lord Sterling of Plaistow, Knight Grand Cross of the Royal Victorian Order
 Sir Christopher Greenwood, Knight Grand Cross of the Order of the British Empire
 Dame Amelia Fawcett, Dame Commander of the Order of the British Empire
 Sir Richard Eyre, Companion of Honour
 Sir Paul Nurse, Companion of Honour
 Dame Marina Warner, Companion of Honour
 The Lord Lingfield, Knight Bachelor
 Sir Colin Berry, Knight Bachelor
 Sir Gary Hickinbottom, Knight Bachelor

Crown Dependencies
 Richard Cripwell, Lieutenant Governor of Guernsey
 Sir Timothy Le Cocq, Bailiff of Jersey
 Sir John Lorimer, Lieutenant Governor of the Isle of Man

British Overseas Territories
 Dileeni Daniel-Selvaratnam, Governor of Anguilla
 Ellis Webster, Premier of Anguilla
 Paul Candler, Commissioner for the British Antarctic Territory and the British Indian Ocean Territory
 Rena Lalgie, Governor of Bermuda
 Edward David Burt, Premier of Bermuda
 Martyn Roper, Governor of the Cayman Islands
 Wayne Panton, Premier of the Cayman Islands
 Alison Blake, Governor of the Falkland Islands and Commissioner for South Georgia and the South Sandwich Islands
 Roger Spink, Member of the Legislative Assembly of the Falkland Islands
 Sir David Steel, Governor of Gibraltar
 Fabian Picardo, Chief Minister of Gibraltar
 Sarah Tucker, Governor of Montserrat
 Easton Taylor-Farrell, Premier of Montserrat
 Iona Thomas, Governor of Pitcairn
 Nigel Phillips, Governor of Saint Helena, Ascension and Tristan da Cunha
 Julie Thomas, Chief Minister of Saint Helena
 Nigel Dakin, Governor of the Turks and Caicos Islands
 Charles Washington Misick, Premier of the Turks and Caicos Islands
 John Rankin, Governor of the British Virgin Islands
 Natalio Wheatley, Premier of the British Virgin Islands

Other realms
Prime ministers and governors-general were in attendance at both the committal service and the state funeral

Canada
 Mary Simon, Governor General of Canada, and Whit Fraser
 Michaëlle Jean, former Governor General of Canada
 David Johnston, former Governor General of Canada
 Justin Trudeau, Prime Minister of Canada, and Sophie Grégoire Trudeau
 Kim Campbell, former Prime Minister of Canada (1993)
 Jean Chrétien, former Prime Minister of Canada (1993–2003)
 Paul Martin, former Prime Minister of Canada (2003–2006)
 Stephen Harper, former Prime Minister of Canada (2006–2015)
 Ralph Goodale, Canadian High Commissioner to the United Kingdom
 Janice Charette, Clerk of the Privy Council and Secretary to the Cabinet, former Canadian High Commissioner to the United Kingdom
 RoseAnne Archibald, National Chief of the Assembly of First Nations
 Cassidy Caron, President of the Métis National Council
 Natan Obed, President of the Inuit Tapiriit Kanatami
 Gregory Charles, radio and television presenter and Officer of the Order of Canada
 Sandra Oh, actress and Officer of the Order of Canada
 Mark Tewksbury, former competitive swimmer and Companion of the Order of Canada
 Leslie Arthur Palmer, Cross of Valour recipient

Australia
 David Hurley, Governor-General of Australia, and Linda Hurley
 Anthony Albanese, Prime Minister of Australia, and Jodie Haydon
 Lynette Wood, acting Australian High Commissioner and Chargé d'affaires to the United Kingdom
 Keith Payne, Victoria Cross recipient
 Mark Donaldson, Victoria Cross for Australia recipient
 Daniel Keighran, Victoria Cross for Australia recipient
 Ben Roberts-Smith, Victoria Cross for Australia recipient
 Michael Pratt, George Cross recipient
 Allan Sparkes, Cross of Valour recipient
 Mark Dodgson, Officer of the Order of Australia
 Dylan Alcott, 2022 Australian of the Year
 Valmai Dempsey, 2022 Senior Australian of the Year
 Dr Miriam-Rose Ungunmerr-Baumann, 2021 Senior Australian of the Year
 Shanna Whan, 2022 Australian of the Year Local Hero
 Saba Abraham, Local Hero 2022, Queensland
 Kim Smith APM, Local Hero 2022, Tasmania
 Trudy Lin, Young Australian of the year 2022, South Australia
 Danny Abdallah, Co-Creator of i4give Day and Foundation
 Chris Waller, Inductee, Australian Racing Hall of Fame, unable to attend.
 Professor Helen Milroy, Western Australia Australian of the Year 2021
 Robbie and Gai Waterhouse, horse-racing personalities

New Zealand
 Dame Cindy Kiro, Governor-General of New Zealand
 Dame Silvia Cartwright, former Governor-General of New Zealand
 Jacinda Ardern, Prime Minister of New Zealand, and Clarke Gayford
 Mark Brown, Prime Minister of the Cook Islands
 Dalton Tagelagi, Premier of Niue
 Shannon Austin, acting New Zealand High Commissioner to the United Kingdom
 Willie Apiata, former corporal in the New Zealand Special Air Service and recipient of the Victoria Cross for New Zealand
 Jacinda Margaret Amey, recipient of the New Zealand Cross
 Aivale Cole, soprano singer
 Esther Jessop, founder of the Ngāti Rānana cultural group
 Sir Tipene O'Regan, academic and company director
 Dame Kiri Te Kanawa, opera singer
 Hana Merenea O'Regan, advocate and academic
 Corey Baker, 2022 UK New Zealander of the Year
 Rebecca Smith, former New Zealand footballer
 Jacqueline Gilbert, entrepreneur and Cambridge University MBA graduate
 Ngaire Woods, Dean of the Blavatnik School of Government at Oxford University

Jamaica
 Sir Patrick Allen, Governor-General of Jamaica
 Andrew Holness, Prime Minister of Jamaica

The Bahamas
 Sir Cornelius A. Smith, Governor-General of the Bahamas, and Clara, Lady Smith
 Philip Davis, Prime Minister of the Bahamas
 Ellison Greenslade, Bahamian High Commissioner to the United Kingdom, and Mrs. Greenslade

Grenada
 Dame Cécile La Grenade, Governor-General of Grenada
 Kisha Abba Grant, Grenadian High Commissioner to the United Kingdom

Papua New Guinea
 Sir Bob Dadae, Governor-General of Papua New Guinea
 James Marape, Prime Minister of Papua New Guinea

Solomon Islands
 Sir David Vunagi, Governor-General of Solomon Islands

Tuvalu
 Sir Tofiga Vaevalu Falani, Governor-General of Tuvalu
 Kausea Natano, Prime Minister of Tuvalu

Saint Lucia
 Errol Charles, Acting Governor-General of Saint Lucia
 Ernest Hilaire, Deputy Prime Minister and Minister for Tourism, Investment, Creative Industries, Culture and Information of Saint Lucia
 Anthony Severin, High Commissioner for Saint Lucia to the United Kingdom

Saint Vincent and the Grenadines
 Dame Susan Dougan, Governor-General of Saint Vincent and the Grenadines

Belize
 Dame Froyla Tzalam, Governor-General of Belize, and Daniel Mendez

Antigua and Barbuda
 Sir Rodney Williams, Governor-General of Antigua and Barbuda, and Sandra, Lady Williams
 Gaston Browne, Prime Minister of Antigua and Barbuda

Saint Kitts and Nevis
 Denzil Douglas, Minister of Foreign Affairs and former Prime Minister of Saint Kitts and Nevis

Other Commonwealth countries

Heads of state and government
Other than the monarchs of Brunei, Lesotho, Malaysia, and Tonga (all listed above as members of reigning royal houses), the following Commonwealth heads of state and government attended the funeral:

 Sheikh Hasina, Prime Minister of Bangladesh, and her sister Sheikh Rehana
 Dame Sandra Mason, President and former Governor-General of Barbados
 Joseph Ngute, Prime Minister of Cameroon
 Nicos Anastasiades, President of Cyprus, and First Lady Andri Anastasiades
 Frank Bainimarama, Prime Minister of Fiji
 Ali Bongo Ondimba, President of Gabon, and First Lady Sylvia Bongo Ondimba
 Nana Akufo-Addo, President of Ghana, and First Lady Rebecca Akufo-Addo
 Droupadi Murmu, President of India
 William Ruto, President of Kenya, and First Lady Rachel Ruto
 Ibrahim Mohamed Solih, President of the Maldives, and First Lady Fazna Ahmed
 George Vella, President of Malta, and First Lady Miriam Vella
 Pravind Jugnauth, Prime Minister of Mauritius, and Kobita Jugnauth
 Hage Geingob, President of Namibia
 Shehbaz Sharif, Prime Minister of Pakistan
 Paul Kagame, President of Rwanda 
 Tuimalealiʻifano Vaʻaletoʻa Sualauvi II, O le Ao o le Malo of Samoa, and Masiofo Faʻamausili Leinafo
 Wavel Ramkalawan, President of Seychelles, and First Lady Linda Ramkalawan
 Halimah Yacob, President of Singapore, and First Gentleman Mohammed Abdullah Alhabshee
 Cyril Ramaphosa, President of South Africa
 Ranil Wickremesinghe, President of Sri Lanka and First Lady Maithree Wickremesinghe
 Samia Suluhu Hassan, President of Tanzania
 Faure Gnassingbé, President of Togo
 Paula-Mae Weekes, President of Trinidad and Tobago

Other national representatives
 Joseph Isaac, Speaker of the House of Assembly of Dominica
 Themba Masuku, Deputy Prime Minister and former Acting Prime Minister of Eswatini
 Hamat Bah, Minister of Tourism and Culture of the Gambia
 Gail Teixeira, Minister of Parliamentary Affairs and Governance of Guyana
 Joyce Banda, former President of Malawi
 Gospel Kazako, Minister for Information and Digitisation of Malawi
 Joaquim Chissano, former President of Mozambique
 Yemi Osinbajo, Vice President of Nigeria
 Fatima Bio, First Lady of Sierra Leone
 General Jeje Odongo, Minister of Foreign Affairs of Uganda
 James Harris, Honorary Consul of Vanuatu
 Mulambo Haimbe, Justice Minister of Zambia

Commonwealth Secretariat
 The Baroness Scotland of Asthal, Secretary-General of the Commonwealth of Nations
 Sir Don McKinnon, former Secretary-General of the Commonwealth of Nations

International

Heads of state and government
 Bajram Begaj, President of Albania, and First Lady Armanda Begaj
 Aïmene Benabderrahmane, Prime Minister of Algeria
 Archbishop Joan Enric Vives i Sicília, Co-Prince of Andorra
 Vahagn Khachaturyan, President of Armenia
 Alexander Van der Bellen, President of Austria, and First Lady Doris Schmidauer
 Jair Bolsonaro, President of Brazil, and First Lady Michelle Bolsonaro
 Rumen Radev, President of Bulgaria, and First Lady Desislava Radeva
 Azali Assoumani, President of Comoros, and First Lady Ambari Assoumani 
 Denis Sassou Nguesso, President of the Republic of the Congo
 Zoran Milanović, President of Croatia, and First Lady Sanja Musić Milanović
 Petr Fiala, Prime Minister of the Czech Republic 
 Mostafa Madbouly, Prime Minister of Egypt
 Alar Karis, President of Estonia, and First Lady Sirje Karis
 Sahle-Work Zewde, President of Ethiopia
 Sauli Niinistö, President of Finland, and First Lady Jenni Haukio
 Emmanuel Macron, President of France and Co-Prince of Andorra, and First Lady Brigitte Macron
 Salome Zourabichvili, President of Georgia
 Frank-Walter Steinmeier, President of Germany, and First Lady Elke Büdenbender
 Katerina Sakellaropoulou, President of Greece
 Nuno Gomes Nabiam, Prime Minister of Guinea-Bissau 
 Katalin Novák, President of Hungary, and First Gentleman István Attila Veres
 Guðni Th. Jóhannesson, President of Iceland, and First Lady Eliza Reid
 Michael D. Higgins, President of Ireland, and his spouse Sabina Higgins
 Micheál Martin, Taoiseach of Ireland
 Isaac Herzog, President of Israel, and First Lady Michal Herzog
 Sergio Mattarella, President of Italy, and de facto First Lady Laura Mattarella
 Yoon Suk-yeol, President of South Korea, and First Lady Kim Keon-hee
 Vjosa Osmani, President of Kosovo, and First Gentleman Prindon Sadriu
 Egils Levits, President of Latvia, and First Lady Andra Levite
 Najib Mikati, Prime Minister of Lebanon
 Gitanas Nausėda, President of Lithuania, and First Lady Diana Nausėdienė

 Maia Sandu, President of Moldova
 Luvsannamsrain Oyun-Erdene, Prime Minister of Mongolia
 Milo Đukanović, President of Montenegro, and First Lady Lidija Đukanović
 Ouhoumoudou Mahamadou, Prime Minister of Niger
 Stevo Pendarovski, President of North Macedonia, and First Lady Elizabeta Gjorgievska
 Mohammad Shtayyeh, Prime Minister of Palestine
 Andrzej Duda, President of Poland, and First Lady Agata Kornhauser-Duda
 Marcelo Rebelo de Sousa, President of Portugal
 Klaus Iohannis, President of Romania, and First Lady Carmen Iohannis
 Oscar Mina and Paolo Rondelli, Captains Regent of San Marino
 Macky Sall, President of Senegal
 Ana Brnabić, Prime Minister of Serbia, and her partner Milica Đurđić
 Zuzana Čaputová, President of Slovakia
 Borut Pahor, President of Slovenia
 Hassan Sheikh Mohamud, President of Somalia
 Abdel Fattah al-Burhan, Chairman of the Transitional Sovereignty Council of Sudan
 Ignazio Cassis, President and Head of the Federal Department of Foreign Affairs of Switzerland
 Denys Shmyhal, Prime Minister of Ukraine
 Joe Biden, President of the United States, and First Lady Jill Biden

Foreign ministers
 Bisera Turković, Minister of Foreign Affairs of Bosnia and Herzegovina
 Antonia Urrejola, Minister of Foreign Affairs of Chile
 Álvaro Leyva, Minister of Foreign Affairs of Colombia
 Richard Randriamandrato, Minister of Foreign Affairs of Madagascar
 Marcelo Ebrard, Minister of Foreign Affairs of Mexico
 Narayan Khadka, Minister of Foreign Affairs of Nepal
 Sayyid Badr Albusaidi, Foreign Minister of Oman
 José Manuel Albares, Minister of Foreign Affairs of Spain
 Mevlüt Çavuşoğlu, Minister of Foreign Affairs of Turkey
 Reem Al Hashimi, Minister of State for International Cooperation of the United Arab Emirates
 Francisco Bustillo, Minister of Foreign Affairs of Uruguay
 Archbishop Paul R. Gallagher, Secretary for Relations with States and International Organizations of the Holy See
 Bùi Thanh Sơn, Minister of Foreign Affairs of Vietnam
 Frederick Shava, Minister of Foreign Affairs and International Trade of Zimbabwe

Ambassadors
 Carles Jordana, Andorran Ambassador to the United Kingdom
 Geraldo Nunda, Angolan Ambassador to the United Kingdom 
 Javier Esteban Figueroa, Argentine Ambassador to the United Kingdom
 Kan Pharidh, Cambodian Ambassador to the United Kingdom
 Rafael Ortiz Fábrega, Costa Rican Ambassador to the United Kingdom
 Igor Pokaz, Croatian Ambassador to the United Kingdom
 Ayeid Mousseid Yahya, Djiboutian Ambassador to the United Kingdom
 Antonito de Araújo, Timorese Chargé d'affaires to the United Kingdom
 Sebastián Corral, Ecuadorian Ambassador to the United Kingdom
 Vanessa Interiano, Salvadoran Ambassador to the United Kingdom
 Estifanos Habtemariam Ghebreyesus, Eritrean Ambassador to the United Kingdom 
 José Alberto Briz Gutiérrez, Guatemalan Ambassador to the United Kingdom
 Euvrard Saint Amand, Haitian Ambassador to the United Kingdom
 Iván Romero-Martínez, Honduran Ambassador to the United Kingdom
 Desra Percaya, Indonesian Ambassador to the United Kingdom 
 Mehdi Hosseini Matin, Iranian Chargé d'affaires to the United Kingdom
 Mohammad Jaafar Al-Sadr, Iraqi Ambassador to the United Kingdom
 Choe Il, North Korean Ambassador to the United Kingdom
 Phongsavanh Sisoulath, Laotian Ambassador to the United Kingdom
 Gurly Gibson-Schwarz, Liberian Ambassador to the United Kingdom
 Angela Ponomariov, Moldovan Ambassador to the United Kingdom
 Hakim Hajoui, Moroccan Ambassador to the United Kingdom
 Gyan Chandra Acharya, Nepali Ambassador to the United Kingdom
 Guisell Morales Echaverry, Nicaraguan Ambassador to the United Kingdom
 Genaro Pappalardo, Paraguayan Ambassador to the United Kingdom
 Juan Carlos Gamarra Skeels, Peruvian Ambassador to the United Kingdom 
 Pisanu Suvanajata, Thai Ambassador to the United Kingdom

Other national representatives
 Sahiba Gafarova, Chairman of the National Assembly of Azerbaijan
 Djerassem Le Bemadjiel, Minister of Petroleum and Energy of Chad
 Wang Qishan, Vice President of China
 Liu Xiaoming, Special Representative of the Chinese Government on Korean Peninsula Affairs (former PRC ambassador to the UK)
 Verónica Alcocer, First Lady of Colombia
 Christophe Mboso N'Kodia Pwanga, President of the National Assembly of the Democratic Republic of the Congo
 Salvador Valdés Mesa, Vice President of Cuba
 Eduardo Estrella, President of the Senate of the Dominican Republic
 Kabele Soumah, Secretary General for the Ministry of Foreign Affairs of Guinea
 Abdourahmane Cissé, Secretary General of the Presidency of the Ivory Coast
 Mäulen Äşimbaev, Chair of the Senate of Kazakhstan
 Adylbek Kasymaliev, First Deputy Chairman of the Cabinet of Ministers of Kyrgyzstan
 Musa Al-Koni, Deputy Chairman of the Presidential Council of Libya
 Dieminatou Sangare, Minister for Health of Mali
 Arístides Royo, Minister for Canal Affairs and former President of Panama
 Irene Marcos, sister of President Bongbong Marcos of the Philippines
 Barnaba Marial Benjamin, Minister of Presidential Affairs of South Sudan
 Mustapha Ferjani, Minister Councillor to the President of Tunisia
 Olena Zelenska, First Lady of Ukraine
 Sodiq Safoyev, First Deputy Chairperson of the Senate of Uzbekistan

Other subnational representatives
 Nechirvan Barzani, President of Kurdistan Region (Iraq)

Faith representatives 
Information in this section taken from the official order of service.

Christian

England
 Agu Irukwu, Senior Pastor of Jesus House UK
 Glyn Barrett, National Leader of Assemblies of God
 Helen Cameron, Moderator of the Free Churches Group
 Shermara Fletcher, Principal Officer for Pentecostal and Charismatic Relations of Churches Together in England
 Brian Peddle, General of the Salvation Army
 Graham Thompson, President of the Methodist Conference
 Archbishop Angaelos of the Coptic Orthodox Church in Great Britain
 Vincent Nichols, Roman Catholic Cardinal and Archbishop of Westminster
 Archbishop Nikitas, Greek Orthodox Archbishop of Thyateira and Great Britain

Scotland
 Iain Greenshields, Moderator of the General Assembly of the Church of Scotland
 Leo Cushley, Archbishop of St Andrews and Edinburgh
 Mark Strange, Primus of the Scottish Episcopal Church

Wales
 Simon Walkling, President of the Free Church Council of Wales
 Andrew John, Archbishop of Wales
 Mark O'Toole, Archbishop of Cardiff

Northern Ireland
 David Nixon, President of the Methodist Church in Ireland
 Ian Brown, Lead Minister of Martyrs Memorial Free Presbyterian Church
 John Kirkpatrick, Moderator of the Presbyterian Church in Ireland
 Eamon Martin, Catholic Archbishop of Armagh and Primate of All Ireland
 John McDowell, Anglican Archbishop of Armagh and Primate of All Ireland and Metropolitan

Royal household
 David Fergusson, Dean of the Thistle and of the Chapel Royal in Scotland
 Canon Paul Wright, Sub-Dean of His Majesty's Chapels Royal
 Sarah Mullally, Bishop of London and Dean of His Majesty's Chapels Royal
 David Conner, Dean of Windsor
 James Newcome, Clerk of the Closet
 John Inge, Bishop of Worcester and Lord High Almoner

Westminster Abbey and others
 Stephen Cottrell, Archbishop of York, Primate of England and Metropolitan
 Justin Welby, Archbishop of Canterbury, Primate of All England and Metropolitan
 Robert Latham, Minor Canon and Sacrist
 Mark Birch, Minor Canon and Precentor
 Tricia Hillas, Canon Steward and Archdeacon of Westminster
 James Hawkey, Canon Theologian and Almoner
 Anthony Ball, Canon of Westminster and Rector of St. Margaret's Church
 David Stanton, Sub-Dean and Canon Treasurer
 David Hoyle, Dean of Westminster

Other religions
 Bogoda Seelawimala Thera, Representative of the Buddhist community
 The Lord Singh of Wimbledon, Representative of the Sikh community
 Rajnish Kashyap, General Secretary of Hindu Council UK
 Shirin Fozdar-Faroudi, Representative of the Bahá'í community
 Nemu Chandaria, Representative of the Jain community
 Malcolm Deboo, Representative of the Zoroastrian community
 Aliya Azam, Interfaith Co-ordinator of the Al-Khoei Foundation
 Shaykh Asim Yusuf, Muslim Scholar
 Ephraim Mirvis, Chief Rabbi of the United Hebrew Congregations of the Commonwealth
 Charley Baginsky, chief executive officer of Liberal Judaism
 Marie van der Zyl, President of the Board of Deputies of British Jews

International organisations
 Charles Michel, President of the European Council
 Ursula von der Leyen, President of the European Commission
 Earle Courtenay Rattray, Chief of Staff to the Secretary General of the United Nations
 Jens Stoltenberg, Secretary General of NATO
Thomas Bach, President of the International Olympic Committee

Other dignitaries
 Bear Grylls, Chief Scout of The Scout Association
 Amanda Medler, Chief Guide of Girlguiding
 David Morgan-Hewitt, managing director of The Goring Hotel
 Prince Rahim Aga Khan* (representing the Aga Khan)
 The Duchess of Westminster*
 The Duke and Duchess of Devonshire, former Representative at Ascot and his wife*
 The Duke and Duchess of Richmond, Lennox, and Gordon*
 The Earl and Countess of Derby*
 Sir Nicholas Soames*
 Sir Jackie Stewart*
 John Warren, racing manager, and Lady Carolyn Warren
 Sir Francis Brooke Bt., His Majesty's Representative at Ascot, and Katherine, Lady Brooke*
 Sandy Dudgeon, Senior Steward at The Jockey Club
 Simon Brooks-Ward, director of the Royal Windsor Horse Show and other equestrian events*
 Nicky Henderson, racehorse trainer, and Diana Henderson*
 Andrew Balding, racehorse trainer, and Anna Lisa Balding*
 William Haggas, racehorse trainer, and Maureen Haggas*
 John Gosden, racehorse trainer, and Rachel Hood*
 Sir Michael Stoute, racehorse trainer*
 Richard Hannon Jr., racehorse trainer*
 Roger Charlton, racehorse trainer*
 Michael Bell, racehorse trainer*
 Ryan Moore, jockey
 Sue Magnier, thoroughbred owner and breeder, and her daughter Kate Wachman*
 David Hayes, Australian racehorse trainer, and Prue Hayes
 Monty Roberts, American horse trainer, and Pat Roberts*
 Sarah Rowland Jones, Dean of St Davids Cathedral
 Natalie Queiroz, campaigner against knife crime
 Hsien Chew, founder of Proud Voices, an LGBT choir network
 Pranav Bhanot, lawyer who provided assistance and free meal delivery during the COVID-19 pandemic

Absences
Otumfuo Nana Osei Tutu II, Asantehene of Asante and Kumasehene of Kumasi, was invited but was unable to attend.
 Lech Wałęsa, former President of Poland and Nobel Peace Prize laureate was invited, but did not attend due to his poor health.
 Recep Tayyip Erdoğan, President of Turkey, was expected to attend, but ultimately skipped the funeral in favour of the 77th session of the United Nations General Assembly.

Invitation rescinded
 The Crown Princess of Denmark was uninvited after initially being invited. The original invitation was later reported to be issued in error.

Uninvited states
The following countries were not invited due to poor or non-existing relations between their respective governments and that of the United Kingdom:
 Afghanistan
 Belarus
 The Republic of China (Taiwan) was not invited officially to the funeral because the UK has no official diplomatic relations with the ROC. However, Kelly Hsieh, Taiwan's representative to the UK, was "specially invited" by the British government to add Taiwan's condolences at Lancaster House in London. The Ministry of Foreign Affairs described it as "... the same courtesies as those afforded to heads of state, representatives, and members of royal households from other countries ..."
 Myanmar
 Russia
 Syria
 Venezuela

Notes

References

Dignitaries
Elizabeth II
Events affected by the 2022 Russian invasion of Ukraine
Elizabeth II
Elizabeth II
Elizabeth II-related lists